Unit Rig was a manufacturer of haul trucks, sold under the brand name Lectra Haul.

History
Unit Rig was founded in 1935 by Hugh S. Chancey and two partners, Jerry R. Underwood and William C. Guier, who formed a partnership to build a rotary drill rig for oil field work that was more mobile than existing designs. The group based the company in Tulsa, Oklahoma. By 1947, the partnership between the men was beginning to break down when Underwood died, leaving Chancey and Guier as the remaining partners. Guier eventually took control of Unit Rig and in 1951 sold it to Kenneth W. Davis, who already had several oil-field related businesses under the parent company name of Kendavis Industries International.

During the 1950s, Unit Rig began to diversify its products away from the limited oil-field products and looked towards mining products to utilize their manufacturing facilities. R. G. LeTourneau had already adapted compact electric drive wheels to construction machinery with great success, prompting Unit Rig to investigate the possibility of building a truck and finding a suitable client to take the finished machine.

By 1960, the M-64 prototype truck was completed using General Electric drive systems and featuring special Goodyear low-pressure tires for the suspension. This truck was not a success; however, Unit Rig went on to be a very successful maker of off-highway dump trucks sold under the brand name of Lectra Haul (due to their electric drive system).

Lectra Haul was eventually sold to Terex then to Bucyrus Erie, who were taken over by Caterpillar Inc. around June 2011. Some Lectra Haul trucks are still sold alongside Caterpillar's own trucks but are branded as Unit Rig.

Unit Rig trucks enjoyed a reputation for a simplified customer friendly design with very little requirement of parts during operation. A large fleet of Unit Rig trucks were sold in countries falling in Arctic circle and they proved to be survivor. Their solid rock like performance forced competitors to spend huge resources on R&D to match the performance in not only in sub zero but in sub Saharan hot environment. Unit Rig had just 4 engineers to design whole new trucks and a small but very experienced support group. In early 90s, Unit Rig brought in the first truck that had design intent for a min 8000 hours operation per year and successfully proved it. 8000 hours of operation means an availability over 92%. 

Unit Rig launched  industry's first AC drive 150T (MT3300AC) truck with GE  Invertex drive followed by 240T AC (MT4400AC) truck. Both trucks wrote new chapters in TCO - Total Cost of Ownership which is an indicator of life time expenses made by a client on parts, fuel and Capex. 

Unit Rig' truck design philosophy probably prompted later day's Linux like open source programming.

In 1998, Unit Rig executed the mining industry's largest single order for supply of 160 trucks to Coal India Limited.

Products

Early models
 M64
 M85  Kennecott Copper Co., Chino Mines, Santa Rita, NM received the first three M85s produced, serial numbers 52, 53, and 54. Serial #51 was their factory prototype.
 M100
 M120
 M200 (The first 200 tonne capacity truck with two axles)

Second generation
 MK24
 MK30: Became MT3000
 MK33: Became MT3300
 MK36
 MT1900: Upgraded to MT2050, then MT2120, then became MT4000

Third generation (square appearance)
 MT3000
 MT3300
 MT3600
 MT3700
 MT4000

Fourth generation (rounded appearance)
Sold as Lectra Haul, Terex, Bucyrus and now badged Unit Rig under Caterpillar ownership
 MT2700
 MT3000
 MT3300
 MT3600
 MT3700
 MT4400 
 MT5500
 Bucyrus MT6300AC: 400 ton class truck

Coal haulers
 BD145: Became BD30 Unitized bottom dump hauler
 BD160
 BD180
 BD240/270

See also
 Haul truck

References
 Orlemann, Eric (2012). Haulpak and Lectra Haul: The World's Greatest Off-Highway Earthmoving Trucks. Wisconsin: Icongrafix. .

Haul trucks
Mining equipment companies
trucks of the United States